Nebling is a small village in the municipality of Untergriesbach in the District of Passau in Lower Bavaria, Germany.

References
 Ortverzeichnis der Bayerischen Landesbibliothek

Passau (district)